Schubert Inlet is an ice-filled inlet, 14 nautical miles (26 km) long and 5 nautical miles (9 km) wide, indenting the west coast of Alexander Island lying between the Colbert north of the inlet and the Walton Mountains south of the inlet. Schubert Inlet receives ice flowing into it throughout the whole year mainly because the inlet is adjacent to the Wilkins Ice Shelf (which lies immediately west). The inlet was first mapped from air photos taken by the Ronne Antarctic Research Expedition in 1947–48, by Searle of the Falkland Islands Dependencies Survey in 1960. Named by the United Kingdom Antarctic Place-Names Committee for Franz Schubert (1797–1828), Austrian composer.

See also 

 Britten Inlet
 Haydn Inlet
 Stravinsky Inlet

Further reading 
 M. Braun, A. Humbert, and A. Moll, Changes of Wilkins Ice Shelf over the past 15 years and inferences on its stability, The Cryosphere, 3, 41–56, 2009 www.the-cryosphere.net/3/41/2009/

External links 

 Schubert Inlet on USGS website
 Schubert Inlet on SCAR website

References 

Inlets of Alexander Island
Franz Schubert